National Educational Television (NET) was an American educational broadcast television network owned by the Ford Foundation and later co-owned by the Corporation for Public Broadcasting. It operated from May 16, 1954 to October 4, 1970, and was succeeded by the Public Broadcasting Service (PBS), which has memberships with many television stations that were formerly part of NET. 

The Council on Library and Information Resources (CLIR) provided funds for cataloging the NET collection, and as part of an on-going preservation effort with the Library of Congress, over 10,000 digitized television programs from the non-commercial TV stations and producers spanning 20 years from 1952 to 1972 have been contributed to the American Archive of Public Broadcasting.

History

The network was founded as the Educational Television and Radio Center (ETRC) in November 1952 by a grant from the Ford Foundation's Fund for Adult Education (FAE). It was originally a limited service for exchanging and distributing educational television programs produced by local television stations to other stations; it did not produce any material by itself.

In the spring of 1954, ETRC moved its operations to Ann Arbor, Michigan, and on May 16 of that year, it began operating as a "network". It put together a weekly five-hour package of television programs, distributing them primarily on kinescope film to the affiliated stations by mail. By 1956, ETRC had 22 affiliated stations, expected to grow to 26 by March 1957. The programming was noted for treating subjects in depth, including hour-long interviews with people of literary and historical importance. The programming was also noted for being dry and academic, with little consideration given to entertainment value, a marked contrast to commercial television. Many of the shows were designed as adult education, and ETRC was nicknamed the "University of the Air" (or, less kindly, "The Bicycle Network", both for its low budget and for the way NET supposedly sent programs to its affiliates, by distributing its program films and videotapes via non-electronic means such as by mail, termed in the television industry as "bicycling").

The center's headquarters moved from Ann Arbor to New York City in 1958, and the organization became known as the National Educational Television and Radio Center (NETRC). The center became more aggressive at this time, aiming to ascend to the role of the U.S.' fourth television network. Among its efforts, the network began importing programs from the BBC into the United States, starting with An Age of Kings in 1961. It increased its programming output to ten hours a week. Most NETRC network programs were produced by the affiliate stations because the NETRC had no production staff or facilities of its own. NETRC also contracted programs from independent producers and acquired foreign material from countries like Canada, the United Kingdom, Australia, Yugoslavia, the USSR, France, Italy and West Germany.

Starting from 1962, the federal government took over the FAE's grants-in-aid program through the Education Television Facilities Act.

In November 1963 NETRC changed its name to National Educational Television, and spun off its radio assets. Under the centerpiece program NET Journal, which began airing in fall of 1966, NET began to air controversial, hard-hitting documentaries that explored numerous social issues of the day such as poverty and racism. While praised by critics, some affiliates, especially those in politically and culturally conservative markets, objected to the perceived liberal slant of the programming. Another NET produced program begun in 1967, Public Broadcast Laboratory, produced similar complaints.

In 1966, NET's position as a combined network and production center came into question when President Lyndon Johnson arranged for the Carnegie Foundation to conduct a study on future of educational television. The Carnegie Commission released its report in 1967, recommending educational television be transformed to "public television". The new organization would be controlled by the nonprofit Corporation for Public Broadcasting (a corporation established by the federal government) and receive funding from the government and other sources. Under this plan, funds were to be distributed to individual stations and to independent production centers – which is what NET would have been reduced to under this plan. The Ford Foundation, interested Educational Television Stations, and President Johnson supported the recommendations of the Carnegie Commission in the Public Broadcasting Act, which was signed into law on November 7, 1967.

Replacement by PBS

The Public Broadcasting Service (PBS) began as an entity in November 1969, with NET continuing to produce several programs and to be the name of the network. NET's production of NET Journal and Public Broadcast Laboratory continued to be liabilities amid accusations of partisanship funded by the government. Eventually, Ford and the CPB decided to shut NET down, to be replaced by PBS as the network distributing programming to stations, but, unlike NET, not directly involved in production matters, which had been perceived as the main source of the controversies surrounding NET. Instead, local stations and outside suppliers would provide programming for the system, a model that endures to this day with PBS. In early 1970, both Ford and the CPB threatened to cut NET's funding unless NET merged its operations with New York City-area affiliate WNDT. NET agreed to do so.

WNDT's call sign was changed to WNET on October 1, 1970 as the station and NET's merger was completed. On October 5, PBS began network broadcasting. NET ceased to operate as a network from that point, although some NET-branded programming, such as NET Journal and NET Playhouse remained part of the PBS schedule (now produced by WNET) until the brand was retired 2 years later. Some of the programs that began their runs on NET, such as Washington Week and Sesame Street, continue to air on PBS today.

See also
 List of PBS logos (includes IDs for NET)
 Public Broadcast Laboratory
 List of United States television networks

References

External links
 National Education Television Center on The Museum of Broadcast Communications
 
 Frederick M. Remley papers and Nazaret Cherkezian papers, at the University of Maryland libraries. Remley worked on the Video Tape Engineering Committee focusing on standards for video tape recordings, and Cherkezian served as executive producer for NET's News in Perspective, a co-production with The New York Times, from 1963 to 1970. 
 Co-founder C. Scott Fletcher papers can be found at the University of Maryland Libraries.
 National Educational Television Records at Wisconsin Historical Society
 Digitized National Educational Television Collection at the American Archive of Public Broadcasting

Defunct television networks in the United States
Public Broadcasting Service
Peabody Award winners
Television channels and stations established in 1952
Educational and instructional television channels
1952 establishments in Washington, D.C.
1970 disestablishments in New York (state)